Richard Rowe was  Archdeacon of Armagh from 1427 until his deprivation in 1429.

Notes

Archdeacons of Armagh
15th-century Irish Roman Catholic priests